Alexi Balès (born 30 May 1990) is a French rugby union player. His position is scrum-half and he currently plays for Stade Toulousain in the Top 14. He began his career at Agen.

References

External links
Stade Rochelais profile
ESPN profile

1990 births
Living people
French rugby union players
SU Agen Lot-et-Garonne players
Stade Rochelais players
Stade Toulousain players
Rugby union scrum-halves
Sportspeople from Lot-et-Garonne